The New Zealand version of the NWA Australasian Heavyweight Championship was a professional wrestling regional heavyweight championship recognized by the National Wrestling Alliance and competed for by wrestlers in the Australasian region. It was largely defended in New Zealand's Dominion Wrestling Union from around 1938 to 1951 and in All Star Pro Wrestling from 1964 to 1968. The earliest-known champion was New Zealand wrestler Lofty Blomfield who defended the title until losing it to American wrestler Ray Steele in Auckland on December 12, 1938. Peter Maivia and Steve Rickard feuded over the title during the mid-1960s with Maivia regaining the title in 1968 shortly before it was abandoned. Much of the title's history is unknown, however, there were 7 officially recognized champions during the three decades it was  defended.

Title history

Reigns

References

National Wrestling Alliance championships
Heavyweight wrestling championships
Intercontinental professional wrestling championships